The Seaview Railroad was an interurban streetcar line running south from East Greenwich to Narragansett, Wakefield, and Peace Dale.

It opened in 1899 and stopped running in 1922. Private right-of-way began after crossing south into North Kingstown from East Greenwich.

References 

Defunct Rhode Island railroads
Interurban railways in Rhode Island